Grit is a 1924 American silent crime drama film directed by Frank Tuttle and starring Glenn Hunter, Clara Bow, and Roland Young. It is based upon a screen story of the same name by F. Scott Fitzgerald.

Plot
As described in a film magazine review, after his father, a reformed gunman, was killed by the gang, Kid Hart is born with fear in his heart and brought up in the gang. Inspired by his love of Orchid McGonigle, another gang member determined to reform, Kid overcomes his fear at the crucial moment, saves the day, and then marries the young woman.

Cast

Preservation
With no copies of Grit located in any film archives, it is a lost film.

Censorship
Grit, with its crime drama plot, was banned by the British Board of Film Censors for an undisclosed reason in 1925.

References

Bibliography
 Munden, Kenneth White. The American Film Institute Catalog of Motion Pictures Produced in the United States, Part 1. University of California Press, 1997.

External links

1924 films
1924 crime drama films
American crime drama films
Films directed by Frank Tuttle
American silent feature films
1920s English-language films
American black-and-white films
Lost American films
Lost drama films
1924 lost films
1920s American films
Silent American drama films